= Nukhr al-Hashidi =

Coordinates: 16°03′N 48°20′E

- Interactive map of Nukhr al-Hashidi
- Country: Yemen
- Governorate: Hadhramaut
- Time zone: UTC+3 (Yemen Standard Time)

Nukhr al-Hashidi is a village in eastern Yemen. It is located in the Hadhramaut Governorate.
